"Oh Boy (The Mood I'm In)" is a popular song written by Tony Romeo. It has been recorded by Diana Trask and Brotherhood of Man, among others. The song is about a woman whose partner/husband is no longer with her and she sadly walks the streets in an attempt to find him. Tony Romeo who wrote the song is best known for his 1970 hit "I Think I Love You" by The Partridge Family, which became a US No.1.

Diana Trask version
The song was originally recorded by Australian artist Diana Trask in 1975. Trask had achieved much success on the Country scene in the US throughout the 1960s and 1970s, but it was this song which became her biggest hit and signature song. The song reached number 10 in Australia in 1975.

Weekly charts

Year-end charts

Certifications

Brotherhood of Man version
In 1977, the song was recorded by UK pop group Brotherhood of Man. The group had won the Eurovision Song Contest the year before and were looking for their next big hit when their producer Tony Hiller came upon this song. Given a new pop slant, the song became a hit in Europe, including the UK where it peaked at #8 during a 12-week run. It featured on their subsequent album Oh Boy!

Track listing 
 "Oh Boy (The Mood I'm In)" (Tony Romeo) 3.14
 "Closer Closer" (Hiller / Sheriden / Lee) 2.39

Chart performance

Other versions 
Lesser known versions include a Dutch translated "Ik mis hem zo" by Ann Christy and "Ik mis haar zo" by male duo Mama's Jasje, also Dutch.

References 

1975 singles
1977 singles
Brotherhood of Man songs
Diana Trask songs
Pye Records singles
Songs written by Tony Romeo
1975 songs